Brucella papionis is a Gram-negative, non-spore-forming and non-motile bacteria from the family of Brucella which has been isolated from baboons.

References

Bacteria described in 2014